Max Forster (born November 3, 1934) is a Swiss bobsledder who competed in the early 1970s. He won two medals in the four-man event at the FIBT World Championships with a gold in 1971 and a bronze in 1970. He also competed at the 1968 Winter Olympics.

References

External links
Bobsleigh four-man world championship medalists since 1930

Living people
Swiss male bobsledders
1934 births
Olympic bobsledders of Switzerland
Bobsledders at the 1968 Winter Olympics
20th-century Swiss people